This uniform polyhedron compound is a chiral symmetric arrangement of 4 triangular prisms, aligned with the axes of three-fold rotational symmetry of an octahedron.

Cartesian coordinates 
Cartesian coordinates for the vertices of this compound are all the even permutations of

 (±1, ±(1+), ±(1−))

with an even number of minuses in the '±' choices, together with all the odd permutations with an odd number of minuses in the '±' choices.

References 
.

Polyhedral compounds